The Didi 10 ("Big 10") is a semi-professional domestic rugby union club competition in Georgia. It is the top tier of rugby competitions in the country.

Current Table 
2018–19 Didi 10 season:

<noinclude>

List of Champions

Teams 2019-20

Didi 10 (Top Division)

 Lelo
 Batumi
 Aia
 Kharebi
 Academy
 Jiki
 Kochebi
 Iunkerebi
 Locomotive
 Armazi

See also
 Rugby union in Georgia
 Georgia Cup
 Soviet Cup
 Soviet Championship

References

External links
 Georgia Champs
 Georgia Rugby Bunch

 
National rugby union premier leagues
Sports leagues established in 1967
Geo